Admiral Jorge Godoy was the Chief of Staff of the Argentine Navy, until December 2011.

Personal life
Jorge Godoy was born on January 17, 1946, in Mar del Plata, Argentina.
He is married to former María Laura Valdivia Lúpiz and they have two children.

Naval career
1993, promoted to Captain
1999, promoted to Admiral
2000, awarded the Meritorious Service Medal "Almirante Joaquim Marques Lisboa, Marqués de Tamandaré" by the Navy of Brazil.
2001, appointed Assistant Secretary of Institutional Relations, Navy General Secretariat.
2002, took command of the Southern Naval Area and the Almirante Berisso naval base in Ushuaia.
2003, Order of Naval Merit (Brazil), degree Grand Officer
2003, appointed Vice Admiral
2003, awarded Order To Naval Merit, degree Commander, by Chile
2004, Legion of Merit, United States.

Domestic Espionage Charges
In December 2011, Godoy retired upon being charged with domestic espionage against politicians, civic activists, and human rights organizations. According to the accusation, Godoy is culpable because the practice was widespread and continuous across the Navy. Article 248 of the Argentine Penal Code forbids military intelligence agencies from investigating citizens, and from operating within the domestic sphere. As of August 2012, Godoy has been convicted and is awaiting sentencing.

References

1946 births
Living people
People from Mar del Plata
Argentine Navy admirals
Foreign recipients of the Legion of Merit
Recipients of the Order of Naval Merit (Brazil)